Cupidesthes pungusei, the Punguse's ciliate blue, is a butterfly in the family Lycaenidae. It is found in Ghana and possibly Sierra Leone and Cameroon. The habitat consists of dense, wet forests.

Etymology
The species is named for Gerry Punguse, director of the Ghana Wildlife Service.

References

Butterflies described in 2005
Lycaenesthini